The Black Abbot is a crime novel by the British writer Edgar Wallace which was first published in 1926 about the ghost of an abbot haunting the grounds of an old abbey and protecting a lost treasure.

The following year Wallace turned the story into a play The Terror which itself had several film adaptations.

Film adaptation
It was adapted in 1963 by the German studio Rialto Film as The Black Abbot as part of a long-running series of Wallace adaptations made by the company.

References

Bibliography
 Goble, Alan. The Complete Index to Literary Sources in Film. Walter de Gruyter, 1999.

External links
 
 The Black Abbot at Project Gutenberg Australia

1926 British novels
British crime novels
British novels adapted into films
Novels by Edgar Wallace
Hodder & Stoughton books